An ongoing war and civil conflict between the Government of Burkina Faso and Islamist rebels began in August 2015 and has led to the displacement of 1.9 million people and the deaths of at least 2,000 civilians and combatants.

The war has been interpreted as being the Burkinabè theatre of the insurgency in the Sahel.

Background 

Blaise Compaoré, president of Burkina Faso from 1987 to 2014, treated Islamists somewhat better than French colonial officials did. Compaore's Mauritanian advisor, Moustapha Ould Limam Chafi and General Gilbert Diendéré both contacted several Islamist leaders in order to free hostages held by these groups.

Burkina Faso acted as a mediator during the Mali War between rebels and the government. Burkina Faso led an intervention into the country in 2013. However, in November 2014, Compaoré was overthrown, marking the end of his rule and creating a scenario of instability.

Timeline

2015–2016 
On 23 August 2015, the insurgency in the Maghreb spread to Burkina Faso, beginning with a attack on a gendarmerie by alleged Boko Haram members. Between August 2015 and October 2016, seven different posts were attacked across the country, slaying 15 and injuring 11. On 9 October, three gendarmes, one rebel, and one civilian were slain during a battle in Samorougan, Hauts-Bassins. On 31 May 2016, three police officers were shot dead in Intangom. On 1 September 2016, a team of two to four jihadists murdered a customs officer and a civilian in Markoye, injuring three others. Two days later, Sahrawi terrorist Adnane Abou Walid Al-Sahraoui accepted responsibility for the attack.

On 15 January 2016, terrorists attacked the capital city of Ouagadougou, killing 30 people. Al-Qaeda in the Islamic Maghreb and Al-Mourabitoune both took responsibility.

2017 
In 2016, the number of attacks spiked after a new group Ansarul Islam, led by imam Ibrahim Malam Dicko, was founded. The group is particularly active at the border territories of Mali and Burkina Faso. A large proportion of attacks have been focused on Soum province. On 16 December, Ansarul Islam killed dozens of people in the attack on Nassoumbou. On the first of January 2017,  an Imam and defect from Asarul Islam was assassinated in Tongomayel. Two months later, a teacher was murdered in the village of Kourfayel, Soum province. On 22 March, the leader of Ansarul Islam, Harouna Dicko, was shot dead in Pétéga by security forces. By this point, a total of 70 people, the majority of them soldiers, gendarmes and police officers, had been killed in a series of 20 attacks.

Between 27 March – 10 April 2017, the governments of Mali, France, and Burkina Faso launched a joint operation name "Operation Panga," composed of 1,300 soldiers from the three countries, in Fhero forest, near the Burkina Faso-Mali border, considered a sanctuary for Ansarul Islam. On 5 April, Jama'at Nasr al-Islam wal Muslimin detonated an improvised explosive device on a French military vehicle, injuring two people. An allied detachment found the militants during a search operation, but the armed Islamist group members attacked again, slaying a soldier. During the ensuing twelve days of searching, two jihadists were killed, eight were taken prisoner, and up to 200 suspects were arrested. The French forces quickly returned to the offensive, leading several successful raids against military targets.

On 27 May, in Pétéga, a retired policeman was assassinated by a group of armed men, but one of them was killed during the operation. On the night between 2 and 3 June, at least five people, including a couple and their child, were murdered in targeted attacks across Soum province. On 9 June, military forces rounded up 74 villagers in the town of Djibo accused of collaborating with Ansarul Islam. Several of the villagers were tortured, two fatally. On 12 July, a shootout between authorities and jihadists took place, with no casualties.

The head of Ansarul Islam, Ibrahim Malam Dicko, was killed in June 2017. The group announced a new leader, Jafar Dicko. On the night of 24 to 25 July, five members of Ansarul Islam Ansarul Islam were assassinated in the villages of Ndidja, Sibé and Neyba, Soum province, possibly by the new leadership.

On 14 August 2017, a pair of armed men entered a restaurant in Ouagadougou, murdering 18 people before they were shot dead by Burkinabè authorities

On 17 August, a Burkinabè army vehicle rolled over an explosive in Touronata, killing three people and injuring two more. This is the first such incident in the country's history. On 15 September, three men, including an imam and the local village chief, were slain by armed men in Soum province. On 23 September, seven soldiers were killed in a mine explosion. Three days later, two gendarmes were killed in an ambush by jihadists. On 9 November, the Burkina Faso Armed Forces successfully  neutralized 12 jihadists in the village of Ariel.

2018 
On 2 March 2018, Jama'at Nasr al-Islam wal Muslimin attacked the French embassy in Ouagadougou as well as the general staff of the Burkinabè army. Eight soldiers and eight attackers were killed, and a further 61 soldiers and 24 civilians were injured .

In 2018, the insurgency expanded to the east of the country. The jihadists launched three attacks on 13 June: in Tindangou, against a police checkpoint, and on the police station and gendarmerie brigade of Comin-Yanga. During the last attack security forces managed to shoot an assailant. On 12 August, six people were killed by rebels in a bomb attack in Boungou, near Fada N'Gourma. On the night of 27–28 August, eight soldiers died after an explosive device detonated near Pama.  On the night of 14–15 September, Jihadists murdered nine people in the villages of Diabiga and Kompiembiga including a religious leader. A few weeks later, rebels kidnapped three employees in a gold mine – an Indian, a South-African and a Burkinabé, slaying three gendarmes in the process.  On 4 October, six soldiers died after their military convoy ran over an explosive device. That night, an army of forty Islamists launched an attack against local gendarmes in Inata. The following day, six policemen died in a mine bombing near Sollé.

In early October, the Armed Forces of Burkina Faso unrolled a major military operation in the country's East, supported by French forces. On 3 December, gendarmes successfully repelled an ambush at Bougui, ten kilometres from Fada N'Gourma, killing six assailants and injuring another.

2019 

On 1 January 2019, armed men murdered six people in the village of Yirgou, Barsalogho department.

On 10 January, a group of 36 jihadists slew twelve civilians in Gasseliki. 17 days later, ten more civilians were killed in Sikiré, near Arbinda. On 28 January, four Burkinabé soldiers were killed and five others wounded in Nassoumbou. From 3–4 February, jihadists are reported to have massacred 14 civilians in  Kaïn, 80 kilometres from Ouahigouya. On 4 February, the army reportedly neutralized 146 jihadists in the departments of Kaïn, Banh and Bomborokuy. Human Rights Watch alleged that the military had carried out several summary executions in the process. The Burkinabé Movement for Human and Peoples' Rights reported that no evidence was found of an attack carried out by terrorists in Kain on that date, and that about sixty civilians were executed without trial by the soldiers.

On 15 February, the Centre-Est region experienced its first attack. Four Burkinabés and a Spanish priest were killed at a customs post in Nohao, close to the border with Togo.

According to Human Rights Watch, between mid-2018 to February 2019, at least 42 people were murdered by jihadists and a minimum of 116 mostly Fulani civilians were killed by military forces without trial. From 31 March to 2 April, ethnic clashes between Fulani, Kurumbas, and Mossis killed 62 people in Arbinda.

In 2019, Jihadist groups began to start a persecution campaign against Christians. The campaign began on 28 April 2019, when six people, including a pastor, were killed by a group of 10 to 20 people inside a Protestant church in Silgadji. On 12 May, six more people, including one priest, died in a Catholic church in Dablo after it was raided by Islamists. The next day, a Catholic procession was targeted near Kayon and Singa-Rimaïbé, in Zimtanga department. Four people were murdered and a statue of the Virgin Mary was destroyed.

On the night of 9–10 May, French forces attacked a jihadist encampment near Gorom-Gorom, freeing four hostages — two French, one South-Korean and one American. Four jihadists and two French soldiers died.

Despite this success, massacres have continued to grow more common. On 9 June 19 civilians died in an attack on Arbinda. On 18 June, armed men murdered 17–18 people in the village of Béléhédé. On 22 June 15 villagers in Sagho and Toekédogo, Barsalogho department, were killed, and on the night of 25–26 July, 22 other villagers died in a massacre in Dibilou, nearby the city of Kaya.

According to the ACLED, armed violence in Burkina Faso jumped by 174% in 2019, with nearly 1,300 civilians dead and 860,000 displaced.

2020 

On 4 January 2020, a bus carrying mainly middle school students blew up after it ran over an explosive device between Toéni and Tougan, resulting in fourteen deaths. On 20 January, jihadists attacked the villages of Nagraogo and Alamou, inside Barsalogho, Sanmatenga, and massacred 36 civilians. The next day, the Parliament of Burkina Faso adopted a law permitting the recruitment of civilian militias called Koglweogo to fight the jihadists. The idea was initially proposed by president Roch Marc Christian Kaboré in November 2019.

On 25 January, the village of Silgadji was attacked again, this time with a death toll of 39 civilians. Three days later, six soldiers were killed between Madjoari and Pama, in Kompienga province. On 12 February, two civilians were killed by jihadists in Tanwalbougou.

On Sunday, 16 February, a Protestant church in Pansi was attacked by armed jihadists, who murdered 24 people (including the pastor) and wounding 20 more. This was a week before five people (also including a pastor) were slain in a church in the neighbouring town of Sebba.

On 29 February, Sebba was attacked again, leaving ten policemen dead.

On 8 March, the Fulani villages of Barga-Peulh and Dinguila-Peulh, Barga department, were raided by pro-government militias, leaving forty civilians dead.

In October, around fifty refugees who had fled elsewhere tried to return to their home region, thinking that the violence had decreased. Their convoy was ambushed in the middle of the night, ten kilometers from Pissila. 25 male refugees, approximately half of the convoy, were murdered by the attackers. All women and children were spared.

2021 

From 4–5 June, unknown militants massacred over 170 people in the villages of Solhan and Tadaryat.

On 20 August, jihadists killed 80 people in Gorgadji, including 59 civilians.

November became one of the year's bloodiest months for Burkina Faso.  On 14 November, the Jama'at Nasr al-Islam wal Muslimin attacked a gendarmerie in Inata, killing 53 people, including four civilians. The attack remains the heaviest loss of life by the Burkinabe military during the insurgency, and a major morale loss in the country. On 21 November, an attack in Foubé resulted in nine soldiers dead and ten civilians killed.

In December, a group of civilians stopped a French convoy in Kaya Department, alleging that France was secretly working with the jihadists. In a separate incident during that month, Islamists killed 41 people in an ambush, including the popular vigilante leader Ladji Yoro. Yoro was a central figure in the Volunteers for the Defense of the Homeland, or VDP for short, a pro-government militia that has taken a leading role in the country's struggle against Islamists.

2022 

On 15 January, at least 10 civilians were killed in an attack blamed on jihadists in northern Burkina Faso, in the village of Namssiguian in Bam province.

On 23 January, military officials overthrew Kabore's ruling government. Government failures to quell the Islamist insurgency has been described as a possible motive for the coup, which received unusual popularity. The junta's leader, Paul-Henri Sandaogo Damiba, is well-known for his widely popular military operations against Islamists. Damiba has also replaced government ministers (such as Gilbert Noël Ouédraogo) perceived to have handled the insurgency poorly with more popular figures.

Allegations have arisen in the aftermath of the coup that the Patriotic Movement for Safeguard and Restoration may hire mercenaries from the Wagner Group in the future. Damiba had called earlier to hire Russian mercenaries against the Islamists, but was forbidden to do so by Kabore.

On 27 January, France confirmed that from 15 to 23 January 2022, more than sixty recorded jihadists had been "neutralized" in four separate incidents by Burkinabé soldiers working together with French units.

Ten members of Ansarul Islam died during a battle with French forces on 10 February near Ouahigouya in return for the killing of five officers in the previous year. Four civilians died in the crossfire. French authorities expressed regret for the civilian casualties, which they assured was accidental.

On 8–9 February, insurgents attacked the W National Park in Benin, killing nine people. On 12 February, French forces retaliated by launching a major airstrike on an Islamist camp in Burkina Faso, killing forty rebels.
On 11 May 2022, Burkinabè militants crossed the border into Togo and killed eight soldiers.

On 9 June, several attacks took place in the country. A civilian and a soldier were killed at the Karma gold mine in Yatenga Province while 3 to 4 soldiers were also injured. In Seytenga Department, Séno Province, 11 military police were killed when their command post came under attack by a larger force of armed men. In Kossi Province, 4 military police were killed in an attack.

Over the weekend of 12–13 June, between 100 and 165 people were killed in Seytenga Department, Séno Province. The attackers appear to have targeted men and around 3,000 people left their homes. On 12 June, at least six people were killed in Alga, Bam Province. On 17 June, the UNHCR reported that around 16,000 people had left the area since the attack and called for urgent support for the IDPs.

On 15 June, 7 members of the Volunteers for the Defense of the Homeland were reported to have been killed by armed attackers in Bouroum, Namentenga Province.

On 18 June, the ECOWAS mediator to Burkina Faso, Mahamadou Issoufou, stated that the Government of Burkina Faso controls 60% the country.

On 22 June, the Government announced the creation of "military zones". Populations in these designated areas will have to leave their homes and lands in order to allow the country's Armed and Security Forces to fight the armed insurgents without any "hindrances".

On 25 June, the Army of Burkina Faso presented a 2-week deadline for populations in the so-called "military zones" to abandon their homes and move to safer zones.

On the night 3–4 July, fourteen churchgoers were murdered at the Cathedral of Nouna.

On August 8, five civilians and five armed volunteers were killed by unidentified assailants.

On August 9, fifteen soldiers were killed in a double-tap bomb attack.

On August 14, the Collective against Impunity and the Stigmatization of Communities (CISC), a Burkinabe NGO, denounced the massacre of at least 40 civilians perpetrated by alleged Burkinabe soldiers on August 8. The massacre is said to have occurred in Tougouri Department.

On September 5, at least 35 civilians were killed and 37 wounded following a suspected jihadist attack when a vehicle in the escorted supply convoy, heading to Ouagadougou, hit an improvised explosive device (IED) on the main road, between the northern towns of Djibo and Bourzanga, in the north of Burkina Faso.

On September 26, eleven soldiers were killed and 50 civilians are missing following a suspected jihadist ambush in the northern town of Djibo in the Gaskinde area of Soum Province of Burkina Faso. The attack also left 28 wounded, including 20 soldiers, 1 Volunteer for the Defense of the Homeland (VDP) and 7 civilians.

On September 30, a second military coup within a year occurred, with the military removing Lt Col Paul-Henri Damiba, citing his "inability to deal with an Islamist insurgency". The new leader Col Ibrahim Traoré, who led an anti-jihadist unit in the north of Burkina Faso called Cobra, claimed Damiba was being protected by the French army, which has resulted in violent protests by citizens outside the French embassy. Traoré expects Damiba of plotting a counter-attack, which will push the country into civil war. Gunshots were heard in Burkina Faso's capital city Ouagadougou and helicopters had circled overhead.

On October 2, religious and community leaders announced that Damiba had agreed to resign from his position after they mediated between him and Traoré. Damiba reportedly demanded seven guarantees in return, including that his allies would be protected, a guarantee for his security and rights, and that the new junta would fulfill the promise he made to the Economic Community of West African States (ECOWAS) about restoring civilian rule in two years.

On 30–31 December, at least 28 Fula men were massacred in the town of Nouna, in an attack blamed on the Volunteers for the Defense of the Homeland (VDP).

Humanitarian situation 

A humanitarian crisis has erupted in the aftermath of the conflict, with thousands of people killed by both sides. The UNHCR estimates that six in ten displaced people in the Sahel are from Burkina Faso.

Government forces have summarily executed countless civilians, disproportionately targeting ethnic Fulani. In October 2019, 14 men had their turbans ripped off by government forces, then forced into a truck and executed. Fulanis have also been subject to violence by pro-government civilians, such as during the 2019 Yirgou massacre, in which hundreds of civilians were murdered by ethnic Mossis.

In 2020, a mass grave of over 180 civilians was found near Djibo, killed by government forces. Summary executions and war crimes by the military have become an ordinary incident in the town. In one separate incident, 10 civilians were killed in a market place in Petagoli, three of them Dogon foreigners from Mali.

Jihadists have also been guilty of human rights abuses. Villagers have been terrorized during their everyday lives, often prohibited from holding baptisms or marriages; the assassination of local elders has become a common occurrence. From April 2019 to January 2020, Human Rights Watch recorded the killing of at least 256 civilians in a series of 20 different attacks.

Islamists have also targeted schools, the most famous example happening on 12 November 2018, when six Islamists broke into a primary school, mugged the principal, and attacked several students. This was one of the few local cases in which the people responsible for such an attack were arrested. Rebels have justified attacks on schools by painting them as French and Western-style indoctrination programs. Numerous schools have been shut down, leading to an estimated 300,000 children without access to education.

See also 

 Jihadist insurgency in Niger

References 

Jihadist insurgency in Burkina Faso
Civil wars involving the states and peoples of Africa
Islamism in Burkina Faso
Persecution of Christians by Muslims
Conflicts in 2022
Islamic terrorism in Burkina Faso